Jowzdan is a city in Najafabad County, Isfahan Province, Iran

Jowzdan may also refer to:
 Jowzdan Communal Housing, Najafabad County
 Jowzdan, Isfahan, Isfahan County
 Jowzdan Rural District, in Najafabad County